WJMQ (92.3 FM) is a radio station broadcasting a country music format.  Licensed to Clintonville, Wisconsin, United States.  The station is currently owned by Results Broadcasting, Inc. and features programming from ABC Radio.

History
The station went on the air as WFCL-FM on 1983-09-12.  On 1986-01-01, the station changed its call sign to the current WJMQ.

References

External links
 Official Website
 

JMQ
Country radio stations in the United States
Radio stations established in 1983